Scutellaria bolanderi is a species of flowering plant in the mint family known by the common name Sierra skullcap. It is endemic to California, where it is known from the Sierra Nevada and several of the mountain ranges to the south. It is a perennial herb producing an erect stem or cluster of stems 30 centimeters to one meter tall from a system of thin rhizomes. The stems are coated in short, spreading hairs which sometimes have resin glands. The oval or heart-shaped leaves have wavy edges and are oppositely arranged. The lowest leaves are borne on short petioles. Flowers emerge from the leaf axils. Each flower is held in a calyx of sepals with a large ridge or appendage on the upper part. The corolla is between 1 and 2 centimeters long and tubular in shape with a large upper and lower lip. The upper lip is folded into a beaklike protrusion and the lower has three wide lobes. The corolla is white or very pale blue with an area of blue mottling on the lower lip.

External links
Calflora Database: Scutellaria bolanderi (Bolander's skullcap,  Sierra skullcap)
Jepson eFlora (TJM2) treatment of Scutellaria bolanderi
USDA Plants profile for Scutellaria bolanderi
UC CalPhotos gallery of Scutellaria bolanderi

bolanderi
Endemic flora of California
Flora of the Sierra Nevada (United States)
Natural history of the California chaparral and woodlands
Natural history of the Peninsular Ranges
Taxa named by Asa Gray